is a Japanese manga by Noriko Sasaki serialized in the seinen manga magazine Big Comic Spirits, published by Shogakukan between 2008 and 2013.

The main character is Hanako Yukimaru, a rookie, clumsy journalist at fictional Hokkaido Hoshi (Star) Television (HHTV) in Sapporo.

Media

Manga
Written and illustrated by Noriko Sasaki, Channel wa Sonomama! was serialized in Shogakukan's seinen manga magazine Weekly Big Comic Spirits from 7 April 2008 to 27 April 2013. Shogakukan collected its chapters in six tankōbon volumes, released from 30 January 2009 to 30 July 2013.

Volume list

Drama
A Japanese television drama adaptation starring Kyoko Yoshine was produced by Production I.G. and TV Asahi affiliate HTB, where it was broadcast during the week from 18 to 22 March 2019. The series was launched to celebrate HTB's 50th anniversary.

The drama series has been available globally on Netflix, with the English title Stay Tuned!, since 21 March 2019. It has been available on Netflix Japan since 11 March 2019.

After its premiere broadcast on Hokkaido, the drama series has been syndicated to other stations all over Japan.

Cast
 Kyoko Yoshine: Hanako Yukimaru, HHTV journalist
 Hiroki Iijima: Hajime Yamane, HHTV journalist
 Kanako Miyashita: Maki Hanae, HHTV journalist and news presenter
 Takuro Osada: Hayato Kitagami, HHTV programming employee
 Taisei Shima: Tetsutarō Hattori, HHTV sales employee
 Hikaru Takihara: Seiichi Tachibana, HHTV master control employee
 Yō Ōizumi (TEAM-NACS): Masayoshi Kanbara, head of NPO Sprout Mind
 Takayuki Suzui: Takayasu Suzuki, HHTV president
 Ayumu Saito: Mamoru Shōgasaki, HHTV chief executive
 Atsuo Ouchi: Heizō Hasegawa, HHTV news director
 Hayato Myo: Keiji Osada, HHTV police news chief
 Tadahisa Fujimura: Toraya Ogura, HHTV information director
 Kimiko Jitsukawa: Reiko Kurenai, HHTV announcer
 Hitoshi Fujio: Yousuke Furuya, HHTV weather forecaster
 Ken Yasuda (TEAM-NACS): Katori, Higuma TV (HHTV rival station) information director
 Toshie Negishi: Tane, Hanako's grandmother
 Hiroyuki Morisaki (TEAM-NACS): Mamoru Yukimaru, Hanako's father
 Tatsuko Kojima, Sanae, Hanako's mother
 Takuma Oto'o (TEAM-NACS): Gotō
 Shigeyuki Totsugi (TEAM-NACS): Investigator
Source:

References

Further reading

External links
 Channel wa Sonomama! on HTB
 Stay Tuned! on Netflix
 

2008 manga
2019 Japanese television series debuts
2019 Japanese television series endings
Comedy anime and manga
Japanese drama television series
Seinen manga
Shogakukan manga